Bolotninsky District is an administrative and municipal district (raion), one of the thirty in Novosibirsk Oblast, Russia. It is located in the northeast of the oblast. Its administrative center is the town of Bolotnoye. Population: 29,365 (2010 Census);  The population of Bolotnoye accounts for 56.4% of the district's total population.

Notable residents 

Nikolay Aksyonenko (1949–2005), railway manager and politician, born in Novoaleksandrovka

Tourist attractions
 Saint Seraphim of Sarov Church

References

Notes

Sources

Districts of Novosibirsk Oblast